There are at least 45 named lakes and reservoirs in Jackson County, Arkansas.

Lakes
	Doctor Jacksons Lake, el.  
	Masons Reservoir, el.  
	Parsley Reservoir, el.

Reservoirs
	Bear Lake, el.  
	Beaver Dam Lake, el.  
	Bell Lake, el.  
	Bergen Lake, el.  
	Big Horseshoe Lake, el.  
	Blanchard Lake, el.  
	Brewer Lake, el.  
	Bright Lake, el.  
	Brush Lake, el.  
	Buck Pond, el.  
	Campbell Lake, el.  
	Clear Lake, el.  
	Drummond Lake, el.  
	Duck Roost Slough, el.  
	Eagle Lake, el.  
	Eagle Lake, el.  
	Gamble Lake, el.  
	Goose Pond, el.  
	Grassy Lake, el.  
	Grindle Lake, el.  
	Guthrie Lake, el.  
	Hale Lake, el.  
	Hog Lake, el.  	
	Horseshoe Lake, el.  
	Horseshoe Lake, el.  
	Howard Lake, el.  
	Johnson Lake, el.  
	Jonah Lake, el.  
	Layton Lake, el.  
	Little Horseshoe Lake, el.  
	Little Mott Lake, el.  
	Mott Lake, el.  
	Newport Lake, el.  
	Newton Lake, el.  
	Otter Lake, el.  
	Parrott Lake, el.  
	Pickett Lake, el.  
	Round Pond, el.  
	Spradlin Lake, el.  
	Steenbergen Lake, el.  
	Vance Lake, el.  
	Watson Lake, el.

See also

 List of lakes in Arkansas

Notes

Bodies of water of Jackson County, Arkansas
Jackson